This page lists the results of all of the Rio Carnival in the year 2017.

Grupo Especial

Série A

Série B

Série C

Série D

Série E

See also 
 Results of the 2017 São Paulo Carnival

References 

2017